Sir Marshall Reid (3 August 1864 – 20 March 1925) was a Scottish international rugby union player. He later became a prominent businessman, running the Bombay Company and was knighted in 1916.

Rugby Union career

Amateur career

Although from Partick; at the time separate from Glasgow, Reid was schooled in Musselburgh at Loretto. Reid played rugby union for Loretto School and was capped by Scotland while still a schoolboy.

When Reid left school he played for West of Scotland.

Provincial career

He was called up for the Edinburgh District side for the 1882 provincial match against Glasgow District on 2 December 1882.

He played for East of Scotland District in their match against West of Scotland District in January 1883. At the point he played for Edinburgh and East of Scotland he was still a schoolboy.

When Reid began playing for the club side West of Scotland he then was picked for Glasgow District.

In 1886, he was picked by district side West of Scotland District to play the East of Scotland District in the 30 January 1886 trial match.

International career

He was called up to the Scotland squad for the Home Nations Championship and played Ireland at Belfast on 17 February 1883.

Business career

He became the Managing Director of the Bombay Company and was knighted in 1916. He has a portrait in the National Portrait Gallery in London.

He later moved to the produce company Wyer and Hawke.

References

1864 births
1925 deaths
People educated at Loretto School, Musselburgh
Scottish rugby union players
Scotland international rugby union players
Edinburgh District (rugby union) players
Glasgow District (rugby union) players
East of Scotland District players
Rugby union players from Partick
West of Scotland District (rugby union) players
West of Scotland FC players
Rugby union centres